Go Gwi-nam (6 September 1933 – 15 May 2022) was a South Korean politician. A member of the Democratic Justice Party, he served in the National Assembly from 1972 to 1988. He died on 15 May 2022 at the age of 88.

References

1933 births
2022 deaths
Democratic Justice Party politicians
Members of the National Assembly (South Korea)
People from South Jeolla Province
People from Gangjin County